Frank Bergon (born 1943) is an American writer whose novels, essays, anthologies, and literary criticism focus primarily on the American West.

Biography
Frank Bergon was born in Ely, Nevada, and grew up on a ranch in Madera County in California’s San Joaquin Valley. After attending elementary school at St. Joachim in Madera, California and high school at Bellarmine College Preparatory in San Jose, he received a B.A. in English at Boston College, attended Stanford University as a Wallace Stegner Fellow, and completed a Ph.D. in English and American Literature at Harvard University.

Writing career
Bergon has published twelve books—four novels, a critical study of Stephen Crane, five edited collections and anthologies, and most recently two books of essays.  A major concern of his work is with the lives of Basque Americans in the West.  His writing about Native Americans ranges from the Shoshone of Nevada to the Maya of Chiapas, Mexico.

His Nevada trilogy consists of three novels spanning a century from the Shoshone massacre of 1911 (Shoshone Mike), to the shooting of Fish and Game officers by the self-styled mountain man Claude Dallas (Wild Game), to the current battle over nuclear waste in the Nevada desert (The Temptations of St. Ed & Brother S).
  
Bergon’s California trilogy, consisting of, Jesse’s Ghost, Two-Buck Chuck & The Marlboro Man: The New Old West and The Toughest Kid We Knew: The Old New West: A Personal History, all focus on the San Joaquin Valley, and his Basque-Béarnais heritage.  The trilogy also draws attention to today's sons and daughters of the California Okies portrayed in Steinbeck's The Grapes of Wrath.

He also writes about the natural history and environment of the American West in both fiction and non-fiction, such as in The Journals of Lewis and Clark.

With his wife, Holly St. John Bergon, he has published translations of the Spanish poets Antonio Gamaneda, José Ovejero, Xavier Queipo, and Violeta C. Rangel in New European Poets and The European Constitution in Verse.

Bergon has taught at the University of Washington and for many years at Vassar College, where he is Professor Emeritus of English. In 1998, Bergon was inducted into the Nevada Writers Hall of Fame.

Books
 The Toughest Kid We Knew: The Old New West: A Personal History (2020)
 Two-Buck Chuck & The Marlboro Man: The New Old West (2019)
 Jesse’s Ghost (2011)
 Wild Game (1995)
 The Temptations of St. Ed & Brother S (1993)
 The Journals of Lewis and Clark, editor (1989)
 Shoshone Mike (1987)
 A Sharp Lookout: Selected Nature Essays of John Burroughs, editor (1987)
 The Wilderness Reader, editor (1980)
 The Western Writings of Stephen Crane, editor (1979)
 Looking Far West: The Search for the American West in History, Myth, and Literature, coeditor with Zeese Papanikolas (1978)
 Stephen Crane’s Artistry (1975)

References

External links
 Frank Bergon's website
 Frank Bergon in Online Nevada Encyclopedia 
 Frank Bergon in Basque News
 David Rio on Frank Bergon's Shoshone Mike
 Shoshone Mike 100th Anniversary
 Shoshone Mike in the Basque Country 
 Frank Bergon, The New Western Writer
 Frank Bergon's books on Amazon
 Reviews in the New Yorker
 Frank Bergon at Washington College 
 Frank Bergon interview in the Basque Country

1943 births
Living people
American male writers
American frontier
People from Ely, Nevada
People from Madera, California
American people of Basque descent
Harvard Graduate School of Arts and Sciences alumni
Morrissey College of Arts & Sciences alumni
Stegner Fellows
Vassar College faculty